Carsick Hall is a stone built Victorian Lodge located in the affluent Ranmoor  area of Sheffield, South Yorkshire, England, which lies 3 miles west of Sheffield City Centre.

Carsick Hall is notable in the area for being built on an old Roman road, near what is now known as Hallam Head. The property sits on a plot inhabited since the writing of the original Domesday Book.

Carsick Hall was built in 1842 by Reginald Wood for William Creswick of the renowned Creswick's Silversmiths of Sheffield. A building of this age is rare in Sheffield due to the effects of the German Blitz.

'Carsick' is derived from 'Carr', meaning wet woodland and 'Sick' or 'Syke' meaning stream or valley. Carsick Brook passes through the grounds of the hall on its way to the Ponderosa.

Residents and history 
1842 – Erection of Carsick Hall By Reginald Wood
1843 – William Creswick of Creswick Silversmiths puts himself forwards as representative for the Sandygate ward.
1879 – Carsick Hall at Carsick Hall Road sold to Mr. James Ward for £370
1901 – Carsick Hall now 5,072 sq. yards 
1907 – Death of Reginald Wood aged 85 of Carsick View Road Builder and Contractor of Carsick Hall 
1911 – John Pepper Optician married with Ellen Thompson registered as servant for the census
1938 – Elizabeth Craven dies at Carsick Hall wife of Ernest
1940 – Ernest Craven of Craven Rail Carriage Company dies leaving an estate of £31,741 (1,948,323 in  2017) 
1946-1960 Hon.Francis Balfour (second son of Lord Riverdale . Arthur Balfour)
1960 - Eric and Sheila Robinson purchased Carsick Hall
1980 – Peter Horspool of Accroyd and Abbott Building Company purchases Carsick Hall
2006 – Carsick Hall acquired by Stefan and Shaney Firth of The Yorkshire Tile Company.

References

19th-century architecture in the United Kingdom
Residential buildings completed in 1842
Buildings and structures in Sheffield
Residential buildings in England